The 1969 Five Nations Championship was the fortieth series of the rugby union Five Nations Championship. Including the previous incarnations as the Home Nations and Five Nations, this was the seventy-fifth series of the northern hemisphere rugby union championship. Ten matches were played between 11 January and 12 April. It was contested by England, France, Ireland, Scotland and Wales.

Participants
The teams involved were:

Table

Squads

Results

External links

The official RBS Six Nations Site

Six Nations Championship seasons
Five Nations
Five Nations
Five Nations
Five Nations
Five Nations
Five Nations
 
Five Nations
Five Nations
Five Nations
Five Nations